Rasheed M. H., better known by his stage name Shafi is an Indian film director who works in Malayalam cinema, best known for directing comedy films. He has also directed a Tamil film. Shafi made his directorial debut with One Man Show in 2001. Rafi of the Rafi Mecartin duo is his elder brother. Director Siddique is their uncle. Shafi started his film career in the mid-1990s by assisting director Rajasenan and the Rafi Mecartin duo.

Career 
Shafi started his career through the movie One Man Show which was released in 2001. He has directed over 10 films. His notable movies are Dileep starrer Kalyanaraman (2002), Pulival Kalyanam (2003), Mammooty's Thommanum Makkalum (2005), Mayavi (2007), Chattambinadu(2009),  Two Countries (2015). In 2018, Shafi directed Mega Stage Show Madhuram 18 performing in 15 stages in U.S.A and Canada. In 2019, Shafi directed the movie Children's Park.

Filmography

References

External links 

Malayalam film directors
Living people
Indian male screenwriters
21st-century Indian film directors
Malayalam screenwriters
Film directors from Kochi
Screenwriters from Kochi
1968 births